is a former actress and a singer in Japan.

History 
 In May 2005, Manami's mother found out about the Toho Cinderella Audition on Yahoo! website. On January 9, 2006, she attended the 6th Toho Cinderella Audition and she achieved the Grand Prix title out of 37,443 people. This audition was not only to become an actress but to debut first appearing in the film Rough. So in August of the same year, she debuted acting the film-only character.
 In August 2007, she participated in the GyaO audition which was held for the voice of Lyra in The Golden Compass However, she did not make it into the finals.
 Debuting as a singer on August 13, 2008, with single .  was released only on iTunes from June 2008.

Filmography and appearances

Movies 
 Kakushi Toride no Sanakunin: The Last Princess (2008)
 Bizan (2007)
 Rough (2006)

Drama 
 Hatachi no Koibito (2007)
 Hanazakari no Kimitachi e (2007)
 Taiyo To Umi No Kyoshitsu (2008)

Radio 
 TOKYO FM 701ch "The Rooms" (2006–2007)

PV 
 Negai Boshi by SHOWTA. (2006)

Discography

Singles 
 (2008.08.13)

References

External links 
Toho Geino Profile
Official blog "Mana Blog"

1991 births
Living people
Horikoshi High School alumni
Japanese television actresses
Japanese film actresses
Actors from Saitama Prefecture
21st-century Japanese actresses
Musicians from Saitama Prefecture